Habib Youssouf (born 19 February 1998) is a Comorian footballer who currently plays as a defender for Volcan Club de Moroni.

At the youth level he played in the 2016 COSAFA U-20 Cup, scoring against Mozambique.

Career statistics

Club

Notes

International

References

1998 births
Living people
Comorian footballers
Comoros international footballers
Association football defenders
Volcan Club de Moroni players
People from Grande Comore
Comoros under-20 international footballers